The medial dorsal nucleus (or dorsomedial nucleus of thalamus) is a large nucleus in the thalamus.

It is believed to play a role in memory.

Structure
It relays inputs from the amygdala and olfactory cortex and projects to the prefrontal cortex and the limbic system and in turn relays them to the prefrontal association cortex. As a result, it plays a crucial role in attention, planning, organization, abstract thinking, multi-tasking, and active memory.

The connections of the medial dorsal nucleus have even been used to delineate the prefrontal cortex of the Göttingen minipig brain.

By stereology the number of brain cells in the region has been estimated to around 6.43 million neurons in the adult human brain and 36.3 million glial cells, and with the newborn having quite different numbers: around 11.2 million neurons and 10.6 million glial cells.

Function

Pain processing
While both the ventral and medial dorsal nuclei process pain, the medial dorsal nucleus bypasses primary cortices, sending their axons directly to secondary and association cortices. The cells also send axons directly to many parts of the brain, including nuclei of the limbic system such as the lateral nucleus of the amygdala, the anterior cingulate, and the hippocampus. This part of the sensory system, known as the non-classical or extralemniscal system is less accurate, and less detailed in regards to sensory signal analysis. This processing is known colloquially as "fast and dirty" rather than the "slow and accurate" system of classical or lemniscal system. This pathway activates parts of the brain that evoke emotional responses.

Saccadic efference copy 
This nucleus is also presumed to play a role in monitoring internal movements of the eye. Specifically, its function is to relay the information about how the eyes will be moved (efference copy, also known as corollary discharge) from the superior colliculus to the frontal eye fields (FEF) in order to aid the neurons in FEF to change their receptive fields to where the visual stimuli will appear after the saccade.

Clinical significance
Damage to the medial dorsal nucleus has been associated with Korsakoff's syndrome.

Additional images

References

 Aage R. Moller "Pain: Its anatomy, physiology and treatment" 2012

External links
 

Thalamic nuclei